This is the discography of German DJ WestBam.

Albums

Singles (as Westbam)

Singles

Singles & EPs (under aliases)

Collaborations with Klaus Jankuhn

Collaborations with Afrika Islam
Albums

Singles

Collaborations with Deskee
Albums

Singles

Collaboration with The Beloved

Collaborations with other artists (as Maximilian Lenz)

Work with Members Of Mayday can be viewed here.

References

Discographies of German artists
Electronic music discographies